The fourth season of the American horror anthology television series American Horror Story, subtitled Freak Show, is set in 1952 Jupiter, Florida, telling the story of one of the last remaining freak shows in the United States and their struggle for survival. The ensemble cast includes Sarah Paulson, Evan Peters, Michael Chiklis, Frances Conroy, Denis O'Hare, Emma Roberts, Finn Wittrock, Angela Bassett, Kathy Bates, and Jessica Lange, with all returning from previous seasons, except newcomers Chiklis and Wittrock. The season marks the first not to be strictly anthological, with Lily Rabe, Naomi Grossman, and John Cromwell reprising their roles from the series' second cycle, Asylum.

Created by Ryan Murphy and Brad Falchuk for cable network FX, the series is produced by 20th Century Fox Television. Freak Show was broadcast between October 8, 2014, to January 21, 2015, consisting of 13 episodes. Like its predecessors, the season was met with positive reviews and consistently strong ratings. The premiere episode attracted a series high of 6.13 million viewers, making it the most viewed episode of the series. It ultimately became FX's most-watched program ever, surpassing its previous installment, Coven. The season garnered a total of twenty Emmy Award nominations, the most for any season of American Horror Story to date, including nominations for Outstanding Limited Series, and six acting nominations for Lange, O'Hare, Wittrock, Paulson, Bassett, and Bates. In addition, Paulson won for Best Supporting Actress in a Movie or Limited Series at the 5th Critics' Choice Television Awards.

Cast and characters

Main

 Sarah Paulson as Bette and Dot Tattler 
 Evan Peters as Jimmy Darling 
 Michael Chiklis as Dell Toledo
 Frances Conroy as Gloria Mott 
 Denis O'Hare as Stanley 
 Emma Roberts as Maggie Esmerelda 
 Finn Wittrock as Dandy Mott 
 Angela Bassett as Desiree Dupree 
 Kathy Bates as Ethel Darling 
 Jessica Lange as Elsa Mars

Special guest stars
 Wes Bentley as Edward Mordrake
 Celia Weston as Lillian Hemmings
 Gabourey Sidibe as Regina Ross 
 Matt Bomer as Andy 
 Danny Huston as Massimo Dolcefino 
 Lily Rabe as Sister Mary Eunice McKee 
 Neil Patrick Harris as Chester Creb

Recurring
 Naomi Grossman as Pepper
 Grace Gummer as Penny 
 Chrissy Metz as Barbara / Ima Wiggles 
 Malcolm-Jamal Warner as Angus T. Jefferson 
 Erika Ervin as Amazon Eve 
 Mat Fraser as Paul the Illustrated Seal 
 Jyoti Amge as Ma Petite 
 Rose Siggins as Legless Suzi 
 Ben Woolf as Meep 
 Lee Tergesen as Vince 
 Christopher Neiman as Salty 
 Drew Rin Varick as Toulouse 
 PJ Marshall as Detective Colquitt 
 John Carroll Lynch as Twisty the Clown 
 Major Dodson as Corey Bachman 
 Skyler Samuels as Bonnie Lipton 
 Patti LaBelle as Dora Ross

Guest stars
 Jamie Brewer as Marjorie
 Mare Winningham as Rita Gayheart
 Matthew Glave as Larry Gayheart 
 David Burtka as Michael Beck 
 Heather Langenkamp as Female Toulouse 
 Jerry Leggio as Dr. Bonham
 Dalton E. Gray as Mike
 Shauna Rappold as Lucy Creb
 Kathy Deitch as young Ethel Darling
 Edward Gelhaus as young Dell Toledo
 Angela Sarafyan as Alice
 John Cromwell as young Arthur Arden

Episodes

Production

Development

In November 2013, FX announced that the show had been renewed for a fourth season. Series co-creator Ryan Murphy hinted that clues about the fourth season would be hidden in the final episodes of the third season. In March 2014, the season was revealed to be set at a carnival, according to co-executive producer/writer Douglas Petrie. It was also revealed that Lange would be playing a role similar to Marlene Dietrich. Murphy revealed that the season would take place in 1950, adding: "If you look historically what happened in the year 1950, there's some more clues in that year. It's a period piece. We try and do the opposite of what we've done before. Jessica Lange has already started practicing her German accent, so I'm very excited!" Murphy indicated that this season drew inspiration from Tod Browning's Freaks and Herk Harvey's Carnival of Souls. This season featured the largest set ever constructed for American Horror Story, with Murphy stating: "We had to build an entire city. We built an entire huge compound, and then we had to build the interior of all those buildings on set. It's all, period. And it's all based on [production designer] Mark Worthington's immaculate research."

Casting
Ryan Murphy confirmed that Jessica Lange would be returning for a fourth season, although said to be in a reduced capacity. She portrayed Elsa Mars, the owner of the freak show. In November 2013, Murphy said he approached Kathy Bates and Angela Bassett to return. Bassett later confirmed in an interview with Access Hollywood that she would be indeed coming back. They portrayed Ethel Darling and Desiree Dupree, respectively. In an interview with The Hollywood Reporter, Sarah Paulson revealed she would be returning, possibly for a main role, which was later revealed to be the conjoined twins Bette and Dot Tattler. It was announced at the PaleyFest 2014 that the cast members present at the panel would all be returning for the fourth season in some capacity, including Denis O'Hare (Stanley), Emma Roberts (Maggie Esmerelda), Frances Conroy (Gloria Mott), Evan Peters (Jimmy Darling), and Gabourey Sidibe (Regina Ross). Jamie Brewer was also added to the present roster, although Murphy later indicated Brewer may not appear during the season. She was later confirmed to portray the ventriloquist dummy Marjorie after appearing in a promo for the final episodes. Additionally, Michael Chiklis was announced to play the father of Peters' character and ex-husband of Bates' character, the strongman Dell Toledo. Finn Wittrock was the last lead actor joining the cast. He portrayed the psychopathic Dandy Mott.

In July 2014, TVLine reported that Wes Bentley would appear in the season' two-part Halloween episode as Edward Mordrake. At the Comic-Con 2014, it was announced that John Carroll Lynch would portray one of the central antagonist during the season, Twisty the Clown. In August 2014, R&B singer Patti LaBelle joined the cast for a four-episode story arc as the mother of Sidibe's character, named Dora, the Motts' housekeeper. Also in August 2014, it was revealed that Matt Bomer would  be guest-starring in one episode as Andy, Dell's secret lover. Murphy took to his Twitter account to announce that the world's smallest woman Jyoti Amge has joined the cast as Ma Petite. Murphy had written a role specifically for Coven alum Leslie Jordan, but he did not appear on the show due to scheduling conflicts.

In September 2014, it was reported that Asylum alum Naomi Grossman would return to portray Pepper, which marked the first time a character appeared in multiple seasons of the series. Lily Rabe also reprised her Asylum character Sister Mary Eunice McKee in the tenth episode, "Orphans". Mare Winningham made an appearance in the same episode, as Pepper's sister Rita. Neil Patrick Harris guest starred in two episodes as Chester, who takes over the freak show when Elsa leaves for Hollywood. Harris' husband, David Burtka, appeared in the season finale as Elsa's husband.

Filming

At Paley Center for Media's 2014 PaleyFest event, Ryan Murphy announced that the season's filming would take place again in New Orleans, Louisiana, although the show's setting is in Jupiter, Florida. The premiere episode was directed by co-creator Murphy, his first effort since the pilot. Principal photography for the season began on July 15, 2014. Production on the season concluded on December 19, 2014.

Marketing
A video released in July 2014, entitled "Fallen Angel", was reported by many news sources to be an official Freak Show trailer. The video – which featured the American Horror Story title card – was later taken down after FX confirmed it was fan-made. Before the debut of the fan-made video, FX had not released any official trailers concerning the upcoming season. The first official teaser was released on August 20, 2014, entitled "Admit One".

As with previous seasons, FX released a series of teaser trailers on the show's YouTube page. FX also used the marketing hashtag #WirSindAlleFreaks in the German language, and its English translation #WeAreAllFreaks.

Reception

Critical response
American Horror Story: Freak Show has received mostly positive reviews from critics. On Metacritic, it scored a 69 out of 100 based on 19 reviews, indicating "generally favorable reviews". The review aggregation website Rotten Tomatoes reported a 77% approval rating with an average rating of 7.29/10 based on 35 reviews. The website's consensus reads, "Though it may turn off new viewers unaccustomed to its unabashed weirdness, Freak Show still brings the thrills, thanks to its reliably stylish presentation and game cast."

Awards and nominations

In its fourth season, the series was nominated for 76 awards, 21 of which were won.

Home media

Soundtrack

The opening theme for the 4th season of AHS is "Carousel" by Melanie Martinez, a song from her debut album "Cry Baby".

Every cover song performed in Freak Show was released by 20th Century Fox TV Records in online music stores following the broadcast of the episode in which it appeared, except the cover of David Bowie's "Heroes", performed by Jessica Lange in "Curtain Call."

References

External links

 

2014 American television seasons
2015 American television seasons
2010s American drama television series
American historical fiction
04
Circus television shows
Fiction set in 1952
Filicide in fiction
Ghosts in television
Mass murder in fiction
Matricide in fiction
Serial killers in television
Southern Gothic television series
Television series set in the 1950s
Television shows set in Florida
Works about discrimination